Uliana Yuryevna Vasilyeva (born 31 July 1995) is a Russian curler. She played third for the Russian national women's curling team at the 2016 European Curling Championships, where she won a gold medal.

Awards
 World Junior Curling Championships: Bronze (2014).
 Russian Women's Curling Championship: Gold (2019), Silver (2015), Bronze (2016).

Personal life
Vasilyeva is a student of the St. Petersburg Specialized School of Olympic Reserve, No. 2 (technical school).

Teammates
2016 European Curling Championships
 Victoria Moiseeva, Skip
 Galina Arsenkina, Second
 Julia Guzieva, Lead
 Yulia Portunova, Alternate

References

External links

Living people
1995 births
Russian female curlers
Curlers from Saint Petersburg
European curling champions
Russian curling champions
Universiade medalists in curling
Curlers at the 2018 Winter Olympics
Olympic curlers of Russia
Universiade silver medalists for Russia
Universiade bronze medalists for Russia
Competitors at the 2017 Winter Universiade
Competitors at the 2019 Winter Universiade